Angus Kennedy may refer to:

 Angus Kennedy (actor), in television and theatre
 Angus Kennedy, 6th Marquess of Ailsa (1882–1957), Scottish peer
 Angus Kennedy, author and former editor of Kennedy's Confection magazine